Anikudichan (North) is a village in the Udayarpalayam taluk of Ariyalur district, Tamil Nadu, India.

Demographics 

As per the 2001 census, Anikudichan (North) had a total population of 1523 with 796 males and 727 females.

References 

Villages in Ariyalur district